Euroacademy was a private university in Tallinn, Estonia, established in 1997.

From 1997 to 2009 it used the name Euro University. In 2019, it was set to be stripped of its teaching rights, as of 31 August 2020.

See also
 List of universities in Estonia

References

External links
 

Universities and colleges in Estonia
Educational institutions established in 1997
Education in Tallinn
1997 establishments in Estonia